Johor Corporation (JCorp) or Perbadanan Johor is a Malaysian government-linked company, formerly known as the "Johor State Economic Development Corporation" (JSEDC). Formed in 1968, it is part of the government's affirmative action programs to restructure its multi-ethnic society by eradicating the economic imbalance between the Malays and the non-Malays. Malaysian "state economic development corporations" were designed to break away from the bureaucratic binds of a regular government department and to become a commercially oriented investment arm of the respective state governments.

It is the only Malaysian state economic development corporation to have its business extended to another state.

Board of Directors
As a state agency, the position of Chairman of the Board of Directors is held by the Menteri Besar Johor, while the directors’ positions are held by the Chief Executive, six officials from the Johor Civil Service; Federal Government officials and two other independent directors : 

 Chief Minister of Johor & Chairman - YAB Datuk Onn Hafiz Ghazi
 Deputy Chairman - YBhg Tan Sri Dr. Ismail Bakar
 President & Chief Executive - YBhg Datuk Syed Mohamed Syed Ibrahim
 State Secretary of Johor & Board of Director - YB Tan Sri Dato' Dr. Haji Azmi Rohani
 State Financial Officer of Johor & Board of Director -YB Dato' Salehuddin Hassan
 State Legal Advisor of Johor & Board of Director - YB Dato' Amir Nasruddin
 Secretary General, Ministry of Economy & Board of Director - YBhg Dato' Nor Azmie Diron
 Secretary General, Ministry of International Trade and Industry & Board of Director - YBhg Datuk Seri Isham Ishak
 Board of Director - YBhg Datuk Nor Azri Zulfakar
 Board of Director - YBhg Dato' Sr. Hisham Jafrey

History
JSEDC commenced its operations in August 1970, with the appointment of Othman bin Mohd Saat, the then Chief Minister of Johor, as its chairman and Basir Bin Ismail as its chief executive. Its first office was located at Level 2, Sultan Ibrahim Building, Johor Bahru, with two staff. The corporation's current office is at Persada Johor. JSEDC changed its name to Johor Corporation at the end of 1995.

Tan Sri Muhammad Ali Hashim was President and Chief Executive Officer of Johor Corporation from January 1982 to July 2010; under his leadership Johor Corporation grew to a total of 280 subsidiary companies valued as RM14 billion at the end of 2009. Eight of the subsidiary companies were listed on Bursa Malaysia, and one was listed on The London Stock Exchange.

As a public enterprise entity,  JCorp has played a major role to foster economic growth in the state, particularly in several high potential economic sectors including agro-business, industrial development, property and others. It was also responsible for the creation of Pasir Gudang, an industrial township in south east Johor. Since 1 July 1977, JCorp has been appointed as the local council of Pasir Gudang, the first local council in Malaysia to be privatised, under a five-yearly arrangement.

Core Businesses
At present, JCorp's core businesses are spearheaded by its respective public-listed companies:
 Palm Oil: Kulim (Malaysia) Berhad
 Specialist Healthcare: KPJ Healthcare Berhad
 Property Development: Johor Land Berhad (Delisted)
 Intrapreneur Venture Division: Sindora Berhad (Delisted)

All intrapreneur ventures are headed by Jcorp's staff. As of 2005, the companies under the Intrapreneur Venture Division include:
 Aquapreneur Sdn Bhd 
 Epasa Shipping Agency Sdn Bhd
 Excellent Relation Sdn Bhd 
 HC Duraclean Sdn Bhd 
 Hotel Selesa Sdn Bhd 
 IPPJ Sdn Bhd  
 JTP Trading Sdn Bhd 
 Metro Parking Sdn Bhd 
 Pro Office Bulk Mailing Sdn Bhd  
 Pro Communication Services Sdn Bhd 
 Sibu Island Resort Sdn Bhd
 Tepak Marketing Sdn Bhd 
 JKiNG Sdn Bhd 
 Willis (M) Sdn Bhd
 Bumihayat Industries Sdn Bhd

In 2006, JCorp bought a majority share in TMR Urusharta (M) Sdn Bhd, a facilities management company.

References

External links
 Johor Corporation Official Website

1968 establishments in Malaysia
 
Malaysian companies established in 1968
Government-owned companies of Malaysia
Conglomerate companies established in 1968